The Grand College of Rites (officially, the Grand College of Rites of the United States of America) is a Masonic organization. 

The Grand College of Rites was established by nine Master Masons in Washington, D.C. on May 12, 1932 for the purpose of controlling and preventing the resurrection of abandoned and unauthorized rituals in the United States. It collects these rituals from extinct organizations and prints them in an annual volume titled Collectanea, which is privately distributed to its own members.

Among the rituals over which the Grand College claims jurisdiction are those of the Egyptian Masonic Rite of Memphis, Ancient, Free, and Accepted Architects, Ancient and Primitive Rite, and others.

See also
Masonic Appendant Bodies
List of Masonic Rites

References

External links
 The Grand College of Rites, U.S.A.

Masonic organizations